Simon Powell may refer to:

Simon N. Powell (born 1955), British cancer researcher
Simon G. Powell, British writer, filmmaker and musician